Encephalartos lanatus (Olifants River cycad) is a species of cycad, a plant belonging to the family Zamiaceae growing in Mpumalanga, South Africa. Its specific epithet, lanatus, means wooly in Latin.

Description
It is an arborescending portable plant with a 1-1.5 m high stem with a diameter of 25–35 cm which sometimes has suffers or branching off the base.

The leaves are 100 cm long and bluish green, almost silvery. They are covered with a thick coat, from which the specific name of this plant is derived. The yellowish spine is straight, with the upper part clearly curved. The leaflets, 10–14 cm long, are arranged on the spine in the opposite way, with an almost horizontal insertion angle; the margins are full and smooth. Basal leaflets are smaller, and often reduced to thorns.

It is a goddess species with male-shaped ovoids of red colour, 25–30 cm long and 5–6 cm wide. Female cones, of the same shape, are 25–30 cm long and have a diameter of 12–15 cm. Both are supported by a 2–3 cm long peduncle and each plant produces one to four.

The seeds, 25–30 mm long, have an oval or oblong shape and are covered with a yellow tapestry.

Distribution and habitat
This species is widespread in a very limited area of the provinces of Mpumalanga and Gauteng, South Africa, at the Olifants River basin. Its habitat consists of steep rocky slopes covered with prairie, with warm weather in summer and cold in winter when frosts often occur and with an annual precipitation of between 660 and 770 mm. It grows at an altitude of about 1,500 m above mean sea level.

Conservation
The IUCN Red List lists E. lanatus as a near threatened species. Although it is present in a very limited territory, in fact, its population is currently stable. The species is included in Appendix I to the Convention on International Trade in Endangered Species (CITES)

Bibliography

References

External links
 
 

lanatus
Plants described in 1926